This is a list of aviation-related events from 2013.

Deadliest crash
The deadliest crash of this year was Tatarstan Airlines Flight 363, Boeing 737 which crashed during landing in Kazan, Russia on 17 November, killing all 50 people on board.

Events

January
1 January
 The rebel Kachin Independence Army reports that Myanmar Air Force aircraft attacking its positions in northern Myanmar have overflown the People's Republic of China during the day, penetrating as far as one kilometer (0.6-mile) into Chinese airspace.

2 January
 The Government of Myanmar admits for the first time that Myanmar Air Force jets and attack helicopters conducted air strikes against rebel Kachin Independence Army forces in northern Myanmar on 30 December 2012, but claims that all of its other air operations in the area since late December 2012 have focused only on flying in supplies to Myanmar Army forces fighting Kachin rebels.
 The United States carries out two air-to-surface missile strikes by unmanned aerial vehicles in Pakistan. One hits a vehicle near Wana in South Waziristan, killing all six militants in it, including the Pakistani Taliban commanders Maulvi Nazir Wazir and Rapa Khan. The other strikes a car near Mir Ali in North Waziristan, killing two Uzbek militants and the Pakistani Taliban commander Faisal Khan.

3 January
 Press observers report that the Myanmar Air Force has conducted daily strikes against rebel Kachin Independence Army forces in northern Myanmar since 28 December 2012.
 An American unmanned aerial vehicle strike in Rada'a, Yemen, kills three al-Qaeda in the Arabian Peninsula members, one of them a local commander.
 In the Syrian Civil War, the Syrian Air Force conducts two air strikes on the rebel stronghold of Douma, Syria, killing 12 people. Syrian rebels claim to have killed the commander of the Syrian government air base at Taftanaz.

4 January
 Syrian Air Force aircraft strike various suburbs around Damascus, including Douma.
 Syrian rebel forces continue attacks on the Syrian government air base at Taftanaz and Aleppo International Airport in Aleppo as part of a campaign to reduce government air capabilities by capturing air bases. Syrian Air Force aircraft strike rebel forces at Taftanaz.

10 January
 After a Japan Air Self-Defense Force Mitsubishi F-15 fighter intercepts a People's Republic of China Shaanxi Y-8 patrol aircraft operating near the disputed Senkaku (known in China as Diaoyu) Islands, two Chinese Chengdu J-10 fighters arrive and monitor the F-15. Japanese officials state that Japan has scrambled fighters to protect the islands 150 times in the previous year.

11 January
 Helicopter-borne French commandos conduct a raid in Somalia to rescue the French intelligence agent Denis Allex from al-Shabaab, supported by U.S. Air Force combat aircraft. Allex dies during the raid, most likely killed by his captors. One French commando is killed in action, another is missing in action, and 17 al-Shabaab members are killed.
 Syrian rebels capture the government air base at Taftanaz.
 France intervenes in the Northern Mali conflict to support the Government of Mali against Islamist rebels. Attacks by French Army Aérospatiale Gazelle attack helicopters and French Air Force Mirage 2000D fighter-bombers blunt a rebel offensive that threatens to take Malis capital, Bamako; French bombing includes raids around Konna. One Gazelle is shot down by small arms fire and its pilot is killed.

12 January
 French Mirage 2000Ds strike Islamist positions around Konna, Mali.

13 January
 Syrian Air Force jets bomb the suburbs of Damascus and a marketplace in the town of Azaz, killing at least 20 people and injuring 99 in Azaz.
 French Mirage 2000D fighter-bombers hit Islamist targets in northern Mali, including attacks around Léré and Douentza and a strike on an Islamist rear headquarters in Gao, where they inflict dozens of casualties. French military transport aircraft bring several planeloads of French troops into Bamako.

14 January
 A Syrian government airstrike hits a house south of Damascus, killing at least five adults and eight children.
 Rafales join Mirage 200D jets and Gazelle attack helicopters as the French air campaign in Mali expands to strike Islamist forces in the central part of the country.

16 January
 During a domestic flight from Yamaguchi, Japan, to Haneda Airport in Tokyo, All Nippon Airways Flight 692, a Boeing 787 Dreamliner, makes an emergency landing at Takamatsu Airport in Takamatsu after cockpit warning lights indicate a battery failure and the presence of smoke; one passenger is injured during the evacuation of the plane. Because of this incident and several others in recent days involving fuel leaks, a battery fire, a wiring problem, a glitch in the computer controlling the brakes, and a cracked cockpit window in various Boeing 787s around the world, All Nippon Airways and Japan Airlines both ground their Dreamliner fleets. Later in the day, the U.S. Federal Aviation Administration grounds all Boeing 787s in the United States.
 An Agusta AW109 helicopter strikes the jib of a construction crane attached to St. George Wharf Tower in Vauxhall, London, England, and crashes in the street below, killing its pilot and one person on the ground and injuring 13 other people.

17 January
Algerian attack helicopters open fire on vehicles carrying hostages and their captors during a hostage crisis at the Ain Amenas natural gas facility in Algeria, apparently killing dozens, although casualty estimates vary widely.
The European Aviation Safety Agency endorses the Federal Aviation Administrations grounding of Boeing 787 Dreamliners. By the end of the day, Dreamliners have been grounded worldwide pending investigation of the possibility of a fire hazard posed by their lithium-ion batteries.

19 January
The Syrian Air Force strikes a mosque and a school building sheltering Syrian refugees in Salqin, Syria, killing and wounding dozens.
Two American unmanned aerial vehicle strikes during the evening kill a total of eight people in Yemen Ma'rib province, including at least two members of al-Qaeda.

20 January
 A Syrian Air Force strike against rebel-held areas in al-Barika reportedly kills seven people.
 Islamist rebel forces withdraw from Diabaly, Mali, to avoid further airstrikes after days of bombing by French aircraft. French aircraft have flown 140 bombing sorties since the French intervention in Mali began.

22 January
 An American unmanned aerial vehicle attacks a ground vehicle in Yemens Al Jawf Governorate, killing three suspected al-Qaeda members.
 The United States announces that the United States Air Force has begun airlifting French military personnel and materiel into Mali, having made five flights thus far.

22–23 January (overnight)
 Two Russian Emergencies Ministry transport aircraft carry 77 Russian citizens fleeing the Syrian Civil War from Beirut–Rafic Hariri International Airport in Beirut, Lebanon, to Domodedovo International Airport in Moscow.

23 January
 An American unmanned aerial vehicle attacks a ground vehicle in Al-Masna`Ah, Yemen, killing six Islamic militants, including two senior al-Qaeda commanders.

24 January
Syrian Air Force jets bomb rebel-held areas in Darayya and Moadamiya, Syria, and heavy fighting takes place near Damascus International Airport over control of the airport road.

25–26 January (overnight)
Airborne French special forces join ground forces in capturing a key bridge and airport at Gao, Mali, from Islamist forces.

26 January
The United States announces that U.S. Air Force tankers will provide aerial refueling support to French Air Force aircraft operating over Mali.

28 January
 Italys highest criminal court rules that "ample and congruent" evidence exists to make it "abundantly" clear that a missile shot down Itavia Flight 870 over the Mediterranean Sea in June 1980 and orders the Government of Italy to pay damages to the families of the victims.
 At the request of the United States, Niger agrees to allow the basing of American unmanned aerial vehicles on its territory, allowing the United States a greater surveillance capability over northern Mali and more broadly over the Sahara Desert.

29 January
 SCAT Airlines Flight 760, a Bombardier CRJ200, crashes in thick fog near Kyzyltu, Kazakhstan,  short of the runway at Almaty, killing all 21 people on board.

30 January
 Israeli Air Force aircraft strike a target in Syria for the first time since 2007. The United States claims that the target was a truck convoy carrying antiaircraft weapons, but the Syrian government claims it was a nearby defense research facility in Jamraya, just north of Damascus.

31 January
 The bankrupt Indonesian airline Batavia Air ceases operations and goes into liquidation.

February
India's Kingfisher Airlines ceases all corporate operations due to financial difficulties. It had suspended flight operations in October 2012.

1 February
 Malaysian Airlines joins the Oneworld airline alliance.

 2 February
 A helicopter crashes in bad weather near Puerto Antequera, Paraguay, killing all three people on board. Paraguayan presidential candidate Lino Oviedo is among the dead.

 2–3 February (overnight)
 French aircraft pound Islamist targets in Kidal and Tessalit in the far northern part of Mali.

 7 February
 The Japan Air Self-Defense Force scrambles four jet fighters to intercept two Russian Naval Aviation jets of the Red Banner Pacific Ocean Fleet which Japan claims violated Japanese airspace off the northwest tip of Hokkaido. The Russian Navy denies that the aircraft, which were participating in a military exercise, violated Japanese airspace.
 Syrian Air Force jets attack the Damascus ring road with air-to-ground rockets to halt a rebel offensive.

12 February
 A North Atlantic Treaty Organization (NATO) airstrike on a village in Kunar Province, Afghanistan, kills 10 civilians.
 Syrian rebels take the al-Jarrah air base in Aleppo province, capturing Syrian Air Force jets for the first time.

13 February
 South Airlines Flight 8971, an Antonov An-24 with 52 people on board, overshoots the runway and crash-lands while attempting to make an emergency landing in fog at Donetsk International Airport in Donetsk, Ukraine, killing five people.

14 February
 American Airlines and US Airways announce an $11,000,000,000 deal to merge, creating the worlds largest airline, with 900 planes, 3,200 daily flights, and 95,000 employees. Under the deal, former US Airways management will dominate the merged airline, but the "US Airways" brand will disappear.

 16 February
 President of Afghanistan Hamid Karzai announces that he will prohibit Afghan troops from calling in airstrikes against residential areas in Afghanistan.
 Iraqi Airways begins flights to Kuwait for the first time since Iraq invaded Kuwait in August 1990.

 18 February
 After cutting a hole in a perimeter fence at Brussels Airport outside Brussels, Belgium, eight armed and masked men dressed as police officers drive in two vehicles displaying flashing blue lights onto the tarmac and confront guards loading a cargo of diamonds onto Helvetic Airways Flight LX789, a Fokker 100 passenger jet packed with passengers and preparing for departure for a flight to Zurich, Switzerland. They steal 120 small packages containing a combined $50,000,000 (£32,000,000) worth of diamonds in a three-minute robbery and escape via the same hole in the fence without firing a shot.

20 February
Their route has taken them over northern Europe and across the Strait of Gibraltar, flying over 15 countries, including Spain, Morocco, Algeria, Niger, Nigeria, and Gabon, with fuel and visa problems forcing them to spend several weeks on the ground at Port Harcourt, Nigeria, and Cabinda, Angola. They have used  of aviation charts and maps along the way. Tracey Curtis-Taylor flies with them to prepare for her own South Africa-to-England flight planned for November–December 2013.

22 February
 The United States Department of Defense grounds all 51 United States Air Force, United States Navy, and United States Marine Corps F-35 Lightning II aircraft after an inspection of a U.S. Air Force F-35A at Edwards Air Force Base, California, discovers a cracked engine blade.

26 February
 A fire starts aboard the Ultramagic N-425 hot-air balloon SU-283 while it is attempting to land near Luxor, Egypt, carrying 19 tourists, a tour guide, and its pilot. The 19 people still aboard, seven of whom jump to their deaths to escape the fire, are killed. It is the deadliest hot-air balloon accident in history, exceeding the death toll in a 1989 accident in Australia.

28 February
 The United States Department of Defense announces that its F-35 Lightning II fleet, grounded since 22 February, will resume flying after an investigation determines that a cracked engine blade found in a U.S. Air Force F-35A was due to unique circumstances and is not a fleetwide problem.

March

 The United States Border Patrol launches a new program during March using MQ-9 Reaper unmanned aerial vehicles to take videos of remote areas along the border between the United States and Mexico to detect signs of illegal border crossings. Reapers collect video of an area, then return no more than three days later to collect new video, allowing analysts to compare the videos for signs of border crossings during the intervening period. By November 2014, the Reapers will monitor about half of the border regularly.
 Lion Air and Airbus sign the most valuable commercial order in history, a $23,800,000,000 Lion Air order for 234 Airbus A320 airliners. It exceeds the previous most valuable order, a $22,400,000,000 order by Lion Air for 230 airliners from Boeing in 2011.
 Evergreen International Aviation sells its subsidiary Evergreen Helicopters to Erickson Air-Crane.

4 March
 Two minutes from touchdown at Goma International Airport, the Compagnie Africaine d'Aviation Fokker 50 9Q-CBD crashes in bad weather in an empty lot in Goma, Democratic Republic of the Congo, killing six of the people on board and injuring all three survivors.

5 March
 Royal Malaysian Air Force aircraft – three F/A-18 Hornets and five BAE Systems Hawks – bomb and strafe a group of about 200 gunmen from Simunul in the southern Philippines in their camp at Kampung Tanduo in Sabah, Malaysia, on the island of Borneo. Malaysian military helicopters participate in a follow-up ground attack by Malaysian Army and security forces against the Filipinos. The Filipinos had landed in Sabah on 9 February in an attempt to enforce the territorial claim of the Sultanate of Sulu to eastern Sabah, triggering a standoff with Malaysian police and military forces.

9 March
 A UTair Aviation-owned Mil Mi-8 helicopter (NATO reporting name "Hip") working for the United Nations crashes near Bukavu in South Kivu province in the Democratic Republic of the Congo due to the weather, killing its entire Russian crew of four men. The bodies are found at the site of the crash.

17 March
 Two inmates at a prison in Saint-Jérôme, Quebec, Canada, escape by climbing a rope lowered from a helicopter. They are arrested later the same day.

18 March
 Syrian Air Force aircraft attack targets in Lebanon for the first time, firing rockets at Syrian rebel positions around Arsai.

21 March
 Late in the evening, two missiles fired by American unmanned aerial vehicles strike a ground vehicle moving through Data Khel in North Waziristan, Pakistan, killing all four men in the vehicle.

22 March
 The Malaysian low-cost airline Malindo Air makes its first flights.
 A Central African Republic government attack helicopter strikes a rebel column approaching Bangui, temporarily halting it.

25 March
 Boeing makes the first of two Boeing 787 Dreamliner test flights to show that modifications to the 787's lithium-ion battery system have solved the problem of battery overheating experienced by Dreamliners earlier in the year. The aircraft, bearing the livery of LOT Polish Airlines, departs from Paine Field in Everett, Washington, flies south down the coast of Washington and halfway down the coast of Oregon, and makes a low-altitude, low-speed circle over the Strait of Juan de Fuca before returning without incident.

28 March
 Two United States Air Force B-2 Spirit bombers make the first nonstop B-2 flight to and from the Korean Peninsula, departing Whiteman Air Force Base, Missouri, bombing a target range on a South Korean island, and returning in a 37-hour flight. The flight, part of the annual Foal Eagle field training exercise, is intended to signal American support to South Korea in the face of belligerent North Korean rhetoric.
 The low-cost Indian-Malaysian airline AirAsia India is founded. It will begin flight operations in June 2014.

31 March
 Austrian Airlines retires the "Lauda Air" brand. Austrian Airlines and Lauda Air had merged in July 2012.
 A United States Marine Corps pilot makes the first vertical landing in a production Lockheed Martin F-35B Lightning II.

April
 Bankrupt Aerosvit Airlines ceases operations. Some of its fleet is transferred to Ukraine International Airlines.
 Meridiana Fly completes its merger with Air Italy and is renamed Meridiana.

5 April
 Boeing makes the second of two Boeing 787 Dreamliner test flights to show that modifications to the 787s lithium-ion battery system have solved the problem of battery overheating experienced by Dreamliners earlier in the year. The aircraft, bearing the livery of LOT Polish Airlines, makes a 755-mile (1,216-kilometer) flight along the United States West Coast in just under two hours without incident. The completion of two successful test flights is a major step toward ending the worldwide grounding of 787s.

6 April

 A Syrian Air Force strike against anti-government Kurdish militia forces in Aleppo, Syria, kills at least 15 people, nine of them children.

7 April
A Helicópteros del Pacífico (Helipac) Mil Mi-8P registration OB-1916-P crashes en route from Iquitos to a Perenco site near the Curaray River, in the Loreto Region of Peru. All 13 people on board died.
 Widespread Syrian airstrikes against rebel forces in seven cities and regions kill at least 20 people.

13 April
 Lion Air Flight 904, a Boeing 737-8GP carrying 108 people, ditches in shallow water off Bali  from the runway while attempting to land at Ngurah Rai International Airport in Denpasar, Indonesia. All on board survive, although 22 people are injured.
 The Syrian Air Force strikes Saraqib, Syria, reportedly killing 20 people.

14 April
 The Syrian Air Force strikes the Qaboun neighborhood of Damascus, reportedly killing nine children. A Syrian jet also strikes the Kurdish village of Hadad in northeastern Syria, killing at least 16 people.

25 April
 The Israeli Air Force scrambles an F-16 Fighting Falcon fighter to intercept an unmanned aerial vehicle (UAV) as it approaches Israel from the coast of Lebanon. The F-16 shoots down the UAV, which Israel suspects belonged to Hezbollah, over the Mediterranean Sea at an altitude of  six miles (9.7 km) from Haifa, Israel.

27 April
 The Boeing 787 Dreamliner makes its first passenger-carrying flight since the worldwide grounding of Dreamliners in January 2013, when a packed Ethiopian Airlines 787 flies from Addis Ababa, Ethiopia, to Nairobi, Kenya. Boeing vice president Randy Tinseth is among the passengers.

29 April
 National Airlines Flight 102, a Boeing 747-428BCF cargo aircraft, crashes just after takeoff from Bagram Airfield in Bagram, Afghanistan, after its crew reported that its cargo of five heavy military vehicles had shifted and caused the aircraft to stall. Its entire crew of seven dies in the crash.
 A Nordwind Airlines Airbus A320 airliner on a charter flight from Sharm-el-Sheikh, Egypt, to Kazan, Russia, with 159 passengers on board, takes evasive action to avoid two surface-to-air missiles fired at it from Syrian territory. The missiles explode near the A320, but it is undamaged and continues its flight to Kazan without further incident. The same day, the Russian air transport agency Rosaviation bans Russian civilian aircraft from flying in Syrian airspace until further notice.
 Virgin Galactics commercial spacecraft SpaceShipTwo makes its first powered flight. Mark Stuckey is the pilot and Mike Alsbury the co-pilot for the flight.

30 April
 An Israeli aircraft conducts the first lethal airstrike in the Gaza Strip since November 2012, killing Palestinian Mujahideen Shura Council in the Environs of Jerusalem member Haitham Mishal as he rides a motorcycle northwest of Gaza City. A bystander is wounded.

May

1 May
 A Boeing X-51A WaveRider unmanned scramjet demonstration aircraft detaches from a Boeing B-52H Stratofortress and reaches Mach 4.8 powered by a booster rocket. It then separates cleanly from the booster, ignites its own engine, accelerates to Mach 5.1, and flies for 240 seconds – setting the record for the longest air-breathing hypersonic flight in history – before running out of fuel and plunging into the Pacific Ocean off Point Mugu, California, after transmitting 370 seconds of telemetry. The flight – the fourth and last planned X-51A test flight and the first successful one – completes the X-51 program.

3 May
 Batik Air, a full-service airline owned by Lion Air, makes its first flight.
 Israeli Air Force aircraft strike a shipment of advanced surface-to-surface missiles at Damascus International Airport in Damascus, Syria. The shipment had originated in Iran and was destined for delivery to Hezbollah in Lebanon.

4 May
 The first Solar Impulse aircraft, HB-SIA, the world's first solar powered aircraft capable of operating day and night, completes the first leg of its attempt to become the solar-powered aircraft to fly across the continental United States, landing at Phoenix Sky Harbor International Airport in Phoenix, Arizona at 12:30 a.m.

5 May
Russian wingsuit flier Valery Rozov sets a world record for the highest wingsuit BASE jump, jumping off Mount Everest's North Col at an altitude of 7,220 meters (23,687 feet).
 Israeli aircraft strike Mount Qassioun, which overlooks Damascus, Syria, targeting surface-to-surface missiles sent from Iran to Hezbollah. The Syrian government claims the strike targeted a scientific research facility.

11 May
 After an Israeli Air Force Heron-1 unmanned aerial vehicle flying over the Mediterranean Sea malfunctions, the Israeli Army shoots it down to prevent it from crashing in a populated area. The following day Israel grounds its fleet of Heron-1 unmanned aerial vehicles.

14 May
 The worlds first catapult launch of an unmanned aircraft from an aircraft carrier takes place when the U.S. Navy aircraft carrier  launches a Northrop Grumman X-47B demonstrator unmanned combat aerial vehicle in the Atlantic Ocean off Virginia. The X-47B makes two low passes as if preparing to land on the carrier, then flies to a landing at Naval Air Station Patuxent River, Maryland, about an hour later.
 Over the Yuma Proving Ground in Arizona, Lockheed Martins Extended Medium-Range Ballistic Missile target is air-dropped in dummy form for the first time.

16 May
 Nepal Airlines Flight 555, the de Havilland Canada DHC-6 Twin Otter 9N-ABO, skids off the runway at Jomsom Airport in Jomsom, Nepal, and falls  into the Gandaki River. All 21 people on board survive, but seven suffer serious injuries.

18 May
A dawn attack by an American unmanned aerial vehicle kills four al-Qaeda members in Deyfa in Yemens Abyan Governorate.

20 May
 Passenger-carrying flights of the Boeing 787 Dreamliner resume in the United States as United Airlines Flight 1 flies from Houston, Texas, to Chicago, Illinois. United, which plans to resume international 787 service on 10 June, becomes the fourth airline to resume Dreamliner flights, after Ethiopian Airlines, Qatar Airways, and Air India.

23 May
The flight, which takes 18 hours 21 minutes, sets a new world distance record for a solar-powered flight, exceeding the previous record, also established by HB-SIA, in a flight from Switzerland to Spain on 25 May 2012.

24 May
Pakistan International Airlines Flight PK709, a Boeing 777 with 322 people on board bound from Lahore, Pakistan, to Manchester, England, is intercepted by two Royal Air Force Eurofighter Typhoons over the United Kingdom after two British nationals on board get into an argument with the flight crew, make threats about setting off a bomb aboard the aircraft, and attempt to force their way into the locked cockpit. The airliner diverts to Stansted Airport outside London, where armed police board the plane and arrest the two men.

27 May
 TACA Airlines leaves the Star Alliance.

29 May
A missile fired by an American unmanned aerial vehicle strikes a house in Chamsa, outside Miranshah in North Waziristan, Pakistan, killing six people, including Tehrik-i-Taliban Pakistan deputy leader Wali-ur-Rehman.

June
 AirAsia exits its investment in the first incarnation of AirAsia Japan, leaving AirAsia Japan as a wholly owned subsidiary of All Nippon Airways.
4 June
 Braving unsettled weather in the Midwestern United States, Solar Impulse aircraft HB-SIA completes the third leg of its trip across the continental United States, arriving at Lambert–St. Louis International Airport outside St. Louis, Missouri, where it is housed in an inflatable temporary hangar – the conventional hangar originally earmarked for it had been destroyed by a powerful storm on 31 May – in the first real-world test of an inflatable hangar. During the flight, the aircraft flies under cirrus clouds for the first time, and, to the surprise of its designers, its batteries continue to charge at 30 to 50 percent despite the diminished sunlight.

7 June
 Missiles fired by an American unmanned aerial vehicle strike a house in the village of Mangroti in the Shawal area of North Waziristan in northwestern Pakistan, killing at least seven people described by officials as Islamic militants and seriously injuring four others.

11 June
Air traffic controllers in France begin a strike to protest European Union plans to reorganize and privatize air traffic control over Europe.

12 June
In response to a call for industrial action by the European Transport Workers' Federation, air traffic controllers in 11 other countries engage in lower-key industrial actions in sympathy with the French strike, although flights are not disrupted in other countries.

13 June
The French air traffic controller strike ends, having forced the cancellation of over 2,000 flights, without resolution of the issues which prompted it. Industrial actions in other countries related to the French strike are also ended.

14 June
The 11-hour stop at Cincinnati during the trip to Washington Dulles International Airport outside Washington, D.C., is inserted into the itinerary because of strong cross- and headwinds forecast for the flight and a legal requirement that the aircrafts pilot not exceed 24 hours continuously in the air; it also affords the Solar Impulse ground crew an opportunity to practice supporting the aircraft during stops planned on short notice.

15 June
Google has launched 30 such balloons during the week from a field near Lake Tekapo on New Zealands South Island to test the system over the cities of Christchurch and Canterbury.
Escorted by Royal Air Force Eurofighter Typhoon fighters, Egyptair Flight 985, a Boeing 777 with 326 people on board bound from Cairo, Egypt, to John F. Kennedy International Airport in New York City, makes an emergency landing at Glasgow Prestwick Airport in Prestwick, Scotland, after a passenger finds a note in one of its lavatories making a threat to set the aircraft on fire.

16 June
During its stay, the aircraft is placed on temporary display at the National Air and Space Museums Steven F. Udvar-Hazy Center adjacent to the airport.

18 June
The anemometer at the airports weather station records a peak wind gust of  before breaking. Nine flights are diverted to other airports during the 40-minute tornado warning.
EVA Air joins the Star Alliance.

24 June
The Federal Reserve Bank of New York discovers that $1.2 million in $100 bills is missing from a $93 million shipment of cash carried from Zurich, Switzerland, to John F. Kennedy International Airport in New York City aboard Swissair Flight 17 on 22 June. The Federal Bureau of Investigation launches an investigation into where and how the money disappeared between the flights point of origin in Zurich and the shipments arrival at the bank.

30 June
 Air Lituanica begins flight operations, using a single leased Embraer E-170 to provide service between Vilnius, Lithuania, and Brussels, Belgium.

July

2 July
When its pilot loses control in high winds, a Polar Airlines Mil Mi-8 helicopter crashes at Yakutsk, Russia, killing 24 of the 28 people on board and injuring all four survivors.
 An American unmanned aerial vehicle missile strike late in the day against a house in Sarai Darpa Khel outside Miramshah, North Waziristan, Pakistan, kills at least 16 people, most of them members of the Haqqani network.

6 July
Attempting to land at San Francisco International Airport in San Francisco, California, after a flight from Incheon International Airport in Seoul, South Korea, Asiana Airlines Flight 214, the Boeing 777-28E(ER) HL7742, comes down short of the runway, strikes a seawall, and crashes, killing two – one of whom is struck by a responding fire truck – of the 307 people on board and injuring 182 of the 304 survivors; one of survivors later also dies. It is the second crash and first fatal crash of a Boeing 777 and the first fatal airline crash in the United States since February 2009.

7 July
A Rediske Air de Havilland Canada DHC-3 Otter air taxi crashes onto the runway immediately after takeoff from Soldotna Airport in Soldotna, Alaska, and bursts into flames, killing all 10 people on board.

10 July
 A Northrop Grumman X-47B unmanned combat aerial vehicle demonstrator lands aboard  in the Atlantic Ocean off Virginia. It is both the first time that an unmanned aerial vehicle lands on an aircraft carrier autonomously and the first extended autonomous flight by a military unmanned aerial vehicle of any kind.

11 July
 United States Immigration and Customs Enforcement begins a program of twice-weekly flights involuntarily carrying up to 136 illegal immigrants at a time from El Paso, Texas, to Mexico City, Mexico. The program is intended to deter illegal immigration from Mexico into the United States by flying such immigrants deep into Mexico before releasing them. A two-month trial of the program in 2012 had returned 2,300 Mexicans to Mexico.

13 July
 A missile strike by an American unmanned aerial vehicle kills two Islamic militants riding a motorcycle in the Mir Ali area of North Waziristan, Pakistan.

14 July
 Pakistan Air Force jets bomb at least seven Islamist militant hideouts in Pakistan, killing at least 17 insurgents and injuring at least 13.

20 July
 Angry at Chinese security officers for beating him in 2005, breaking his back and leaving him paralyzed from the waist down, Ji Zhongxing detonates a homemade bomb as he sits in his wheelchair in Terminal 3 at Beijing Capital International Airport in Beijing, China, injuring only himself. He is later sentenced to six years in prison.

28 July
 American unmanned aerial vehicles fire two missiles at a group of men just after they cross the border from Afghanistan into Pakistan, killing at least six Islamic militants – reportedly including a senior Pakistani Taliban commander – and injuring four.

August

1 August
 The Government of Serbia and Etihad Airways formalize an agreement under which Jat Airways will be reorganized and rebranded as Air Serbia, with Serbia owning 51% of the airline and Etihad owning 49%. Etihad Airways is granted management rights over Air Serbia for an initial five-year period. The name change to Air Serbia will take place in October.

6 August
 Syrian rebels capture the Menagh Military Airbase from government forces after a one-year-long siege.

13 August
 The United States Department of Justice files suit to block the proposed merger of American Airlines and US Airways, saying it would harm consumers and lead to substantially less competition, higher airfares and fees, and less service to many airports.

14 August
 UPS Airlines Flight 1354, the Airbus A300F4-622R cargo aircraft N155UP arriving from Louisville, Kentucky, with a crew of two aboard, crashes one-half-mile (0.8 m) from the runway at Birmingham–Shuttlesworth International Airport outside of Birmingham, Alabama. Both crew members die.

24 August
In Nigeria, a wheel-well stowaway survives a flight from Benin City to Lagos.

26 August
 The British light aircraft carrier  is among United States Navy and Royal Navy ships deployed in the Mediterranean Sea in case military action against Syria is deemed necessary in the wake of reported Syrian government use of poison gas in the Syrian Civil War.

31 August
 An American unmanned aerial vehicle makes a missile attack against a compound in Mir Ali, North Waziristan, Pakistan, occupied by Islamic militants from Tajikistan and a vehicle parked nearby, killing four.

September
South Supreme Airlines begins operations.

4 September
 French aviators Gérard Felzer and Pierre Chabert fly across the English Channel from Cap Gris Nez, France, to Littlestone-on-Sea, England, in 2 hours 23 minutes in the electric-powered hot-air balloon Iris Challenger II (nicknamed the "Flying Fish" by the French media). The flight is intended to demonstrate the feasibility of aviation using environmentally friendly renewable energy.

5 September
 American unmanned aerial vehicles fire missiles at a house near Ghulam Khan, North Waziristan, Pakistan, killing five. Senior Haqqani network commander Sangeen Zadran reportedly is among the dead.

10 September
 A live Lockheed Martin Extended Medium-Range Ballistic Missile target is air-dropped for the first time. Dropped over the Pacific Ocean by a United States Air Force C-17 Globemaster III, the target missile ignites and is destroyed by a ground-launched anti-ballistic missile fired by the United States Armys 2nd Air Defense Artillery Regiment on Kwajalein Atoll.

12 September
 In a ceremony at Boeing's assembly plant in Long Beach, California, the United States Air Force takes delivery of the last of the 223 C-17 Globemaster IIIs produced for it. After the ceremony, the final U.S. Air Force C-17 takes off from the Long Beach plant bound for Joint Base Charleston, South Carolina, recreating the flight of the first C-17, which flew from Long Beach to Charleston Air Force Base when it was delivered to the U.S. Air Force in July 1993. Boeing continues to manufacture the C-17, but only for foreign customers.

16 September
 A Turkish Air Force F-16 Fighting Falcon shoots down a Syrian military Mil Mi-17 (NATO reporting name "Hip") helicopter after the helicopter ignores Turkish radio warnings and flies a mile (1.6 km) inside Turkish airspace.

18 September
 Zest Airways rebrands itself as AirAsia Zest.

22 September
 To commemorate the 100th anniversary of the first flight across the Mediterranean Sea, pilot Baptiste Solis flies a near-replica Morane-Saulnier G nonstop along the same route from France to Tunisia. Roland Garros made the original nonstop flight on 23 September 1913 in a Morane-Saulnier H, a single-seat version of the Morane-Saulnier G.

29 September
 An American unmanned aerial vehicle missile strike in the Dargamandi area of North Waziristan, Pakistan, kills at least three Islamic militants.

30 September
 An American unmanned aerial vehicle missile strike against a compound in the Boya area of North Waziristan, Pakistan, kills three Islamic militants.

October 
1 October
 LAN Colombia joins the Oneworld airline alliance.
 Aeroméxico officially launches Boeing 787 Dreamliner service, using Boeing 787-8 airliners.

3 October
 Associated Aviation Flight 361, an Embraer EMB 120 Brasilia on a domestic charter flight in Nigeria carrying the body of Olusegun Agagu, the former governor of Ondo State, from Murtala Mohammed Airport in Lagos to Akure Airport in Ondo State, crashes shortly after takeoff, killing 15 of the 20 people on board.

7 October
 Japan Airlines announces that it will purchase 31 A350 airliners from Airbus for $9,500,000,000 to replace its fleet of Boeing 777s. The announcement ends Boeings decades-long dominance of the Japanese market; before the Japan Airlines deal with Airbus, Boeing and Airbus had competed head-to-head in almost every market worldwide except for Japan.

16 October
 Lao Airlines Flight 301, an ATR 72 on a scheduled domestic passenger flight in Laos from Vientiane to Pakse, crashes into the Mekong River while on approach to Pakse, killing all 49 people on board.

22 October
 World View, an offshoot of the Paragon Space Development Corporation, announces plans to carry tourists into the stratosphere at an altitude of 30 kilometers (19 miles) employing 1,100,000-cubic-meter (40,000,000-cubic-foot) helium balloons. Each flight is to carry six passengers and a crew of two, requiring an ascent of between 90 minutes and two hours to peak altitude, followed by two hours at altitude and a 25-to-40-minute descent. A ticket is to cost $75,000. World Views plans call for a demonstration flight by the end of 2013 and the first operational flight by 2016.

24 October
 Nigerian Air Force strikes and ground attacks by Nigerian Army forces combine to kill 74 Boko Haram members at camps in Galangi and Lawanti in northeast Borno State in northeastern Nigeria.

26 October
 The first incarnation of AirAsia Japan ceases operations following the June departure of AirAsia from its investment in the airline, which had left it as a wholly owned subsidiary of All Nippon Airways.
 Jat Airways begins operations under its new name, Air Serbia, with a flight from Belgrade, Serbia, to Abu Dhabi in the United Arab Emirates.
 The first free-flight test of the Sierra Nevada Corporations Dream Chaser lifting-body spaceplane takes place at Edwards Air Force Base in California.

30 October
 Qatar Airways joins the Oneworld airline alliance.

31 October
 Israeli Air Force aircraft strike Latakia and Damascus, Syria, destroying Russian-made 9K33 Osa (NATO reporting name "SA-8 Gecko") surface-to-air missiles Israel believed were destined for delivery to Hezbollah.
 The U.S. Federal Aviation Administration (FAA) announces that airline passengers will be allowed to use their personal electronic devices during all phases of flight, ending the years-long prohibition of their use during takeoff and landing, although a Federal Communications Commission ban on the use of cellphones to make calls or send texts or data in flight is to remain in force. The FAA states that pilots may still require personal electronic devices to be turned off under certain conditions, but that it expects airlines to implement new procedures to accommodate the gate-to-gate use of such devices by the end of 2013.

November

1 November
 Vanilla Air, a rebranding of the first incarnation of AirAsia Japan, is founded as a wholly owned subsidiary of All Nippon Airways. It will begin flight operations in December.
 In the early morning hours, Israeli Air Force aircraft bomb a tunnel in the Gaza Strip that Israel claims Hamas uses for terrorist operations, killing three Hamas members.
 An American unmanned aerial vehicle missile strike on a ground vehicle parked outside a mosque in North Waziristan, Pakistan, kills Pakistani Taliban leader Hakimullah Mehsud, his uncle, his driver, and two of his bodyguards.
 After leaving a note stating that he wanted to kill U.S. Transportation Security Administration (TSA) agents, Paul Ciancia opens fire with an assault rifle at a security checkpoint at Los Angeles International Airport in Los Angeles, California, killing TSA screener Gerardo I. Hernandez, who becomes the first TSA employee to die in the line of duty. Ciancia also wounds three other people, including two TSA employees, before police shoot and critically wound him and take him into custody. Panicked bystanders stampede, and some of them escape onto the tarmac and take refuge underneath parked airliners. Hundreds of departing flights are grounded or delayed for hours, and many arriving flights are diverted to other Southern California airports; an estimated 1,550 scheduled flights and 167,000 passengers are affected during the day, as are another 40 flights and 4,000 passengers on 2 November.

2 November
 Tracey Curtis-Taylor takes off from Cape Town International Airport in Cape Town, South Africa, in the Boeing-Stearman Model 75 Spirit of Artemis to recreate the flight of Mary, Lady Heath, who in 1928 became the first person to fly a small, open-cockpit plane from South Africa to London, taking three months to complete the journey in an Avro Avian. Curtis-Taylor will complete her flight on 31 December.

7 November
 The U.S. Federal Aviation Administration (FAA) announces plans to conduct testing at six sites of the integration of unmanned aerial vehicle (UAV) flights into the general air traffic control scheme over the United States, and to develop policies, regulations, and procedures to integrate UAVs into the planned new air traffic control system, the Next Generation Air Transportation System. The FAA projects years of testing that will not be complete in time to meet the September 2015 deadline set by the United States Congress for the general integration of UAVs into the U.S. air traffic control system.

10 November
 The world's first flying dress, Volantis does its first flight

12 November
 The United States Department of Justice drops its lawsuit to block the merger of American Airlines and US Airways in exchange for the new airline giving up gates at Ronald Reagan Washington National Airport in Arlington, Virginia, Boston Logan International Airport, Chicago O'Hare International Airport, Dallas Love Field, Los Angeles International Airport, Miami International Airport, and LaGuardia Airport in New York City. The agreement clears the way for the merger, which will create the worlds largest airline, to be named American Airlines but to be run by US Airways management.

14 November
 The U.S. Government Accountability Office releases a report which finds that the U.S. Transportation Security Administrations Screening of Passengers by Observation Techniques (SPOT) anti-terrorism program, in which TSA behavior detection officers (BDOs) attempt to identify suspicious people through observation of their behavior while they pass through airport security checkpoints in American airports, is ineffective. TSA disputes the findings.

17 November
 Seconds after the crew of Tatarstan Airlines Flight 363, the Boeing 737-53A VQ-BBN, initiates a go-around due to an unstable approach while attempting to land at Kazan International Airport in Kazan, Russia, the aircraft noses down, crashes almost vertically, and disintegrates in an explosion, killing all 50 people on board. It the greatest loss of life in a single aviation accident in 2013.

20 November
 Thinking they are on approach to McConnell Air Force Base in Wichita, Kansas, the crew of Atlas Air Boeing 747-400 Dreamlifter cargo aircraft N780BA mistakenly lands nine miles (14.5 km) away at Colonel James Jabara Airport. The plane lands safely, although the airports 6,100-foot (1,859-meter) runway is too short for Boeing 747 operations. Although it normally requires a runway at least  in length for takeoff, the Dreamlifter takes off safely the next day and flies to McConnell Air Force Base.

21 November
 An American unmanned aerial vehicle-launched missile strike in Hangu District, Khyber-Pakhtunkhwa, Pakistan, kills four members of the Haqqani network and two other people and injures five. It is the first such known strike to occur outside of Pakistans tribal regions in five years.

23 November
 China announces a new air defense information zone over a large portion of the East China Sea – including the Senkaku (or Diaoyu) Islands, which Japan claims as its territory – in which non-commercial aircraft must identify themselves or face "defensive emergency measures" by the Chinese armed forces. Japan and the United States protest the establishment of the new zone. Later in the day, the Chinese People's Liberation Army Air Force conducts its first patrol of the zone.
 Syrian Air Force aircraft strike rebel-held areas in northern Syria, killing 22 people in al-Bab and seven in the Karam el-Beik district. In a strike on Aleppo, the aircraft miss their target and hit a crowded vegetable market instead, killing 15 people.

25 November
 The Pakistan Armed Forces unveil Pakistan's first domestically produced unmanned aerial vehicles, the NESCOM Burraq and the GIDS Shahpar, which Pakistan refers to as the "Strategic Unmanned Aerial Vehicles." Pakistani military officials say that both are unarmed and that Pakistan will use them only for surveillance.

26 November
 Two unarmed Guam-based United States Air Force B-52H Stratofortress bombers operate within the newly declared Chinese air defense information zone over the East China Sea on a long-planned training flight, ignoring China's new requirement that they receive approval for the flight and demonstrating that the United States does not recognize the zone.
 All Nippon Airways and Japan Airlines announce that at the request of the Japanese government they will cease filing flight plans informing China of their flights through Chinas new East China Sea air defense information zone.

27 November
 South Korea challenges the new Chinese air defense identification zone for the first time, flying military aircraft into the zone without notifying China.

28 November
 The Japanese government announces that its aircraft have flown into the new Chinese air defense information zone daily on routine flights without seeking approval from China since the Chinese announced the zone.
 South Korea announces that China has rejected its request that China redraw its new air defense information zone so that it does not overlap with South Koreas. South Korea adds that it will consider expanding its own zone.
 An American air-launched missile fired at an insurgent riding s bicycle in Helmand Province, Afghanistan, instead hits a house, killing a two-year-old boy. A second airstrike in the area kills an insurgent.

29 November
 For the first time, Chinese military aircraft intercept foreign aircraft operating over the East China Sea in the new Chinese air defense information zone, but limit their actions to visual identification of the foreign aircraft. China claims to have identified two American military reconnaissance aircraft and 10 Japanese military aircraft of various types operating within the zone during the day. The United States Government advises American civilian aircraft to comply with the Chinese requirement to identify themselves to Chinese authorities for flights through the zone.
 The Chinese aircraft carrier Liaoning deploys to the South China Sea for the first time, docking at the naval base at Sanya on Hainan Island to begin a lengthy training period in nearby waters. 
It is LAM Mozambique Airliness first fatal accident since 1970, and Mozambiques deadliest air accident since a crash that killed the countrys president, Samora Machel, in October 1986.
 The Police Scotland Eurocopter EC135 T2+ helicopter G-SPAO crashes onto the roof of The Clutha, a crowded pub in the city centre of Glasgow, Scotland, at 10:30 p.m., killing all three people on board and six people on the ground.

30 November
 Japans Foreign Ministry announces that it has asked the United Nations International Civil Aviation Organization to examine whether the new Chinese air defense information zone over the East China Sea threatens civil aviation.
 Syrian government helicopters targeting a rebel compound at al-Bab miss it and instead bomb a market, killing 26 people.
 Evergreen International Aviation ceases operations.

December

1 December
 Syrian government helicopters bombing a rebel compound at al-Bab kill 24 people.
 On CBS televisions 60 Minutes, Amazon.com chairman, president, and chief executive officer Jeff Bezos unveils a plan to use unmanned eight-rotor drone helicopters ("octocopters") to deliver packages to the homes of customers in as little as 30 minutes. He displays a working model of such an octocopter, and says that he hopes to put the octocopters into practical use by 2018.

2 December
 Hundreds of Islamic militants attack Maiduguri International Airport and a Nigerian Air Force base outside Maiduguri, Nigeria, temporarily disrupting flight operations and damaging two helicopters and three decommissioned military fixed-wing aircraft. Scores of people die.
 Evergreen International Airlines flies its last flight.

4 December
 During a meeting in Beijing, Vice President of the United States Joe Biden warns Chinese President Xi Jinping not to establish another air defense information zone over disputed waters in the South China Sea like the one the People's Republic of China unilaterally declared over the East China Sea in November.

8 December
 South Korea announces that it will expand its air defense information zone (ADIZ) for the first time in 62 years, extending it 300 kilometers (186 statute miles; 162 nautical miles) to the south, overlapping with Japans ADIZ and with the expanded ADIZ the People's Republic of China declared over the East China Sea on 23 November. The expanded South Korean ADIZ is scheduled to go into effect on 15 December.

11 December
 NAM Air, regional airline subsidiary of Sriwijaya Air in Indonesia takes its first flight from Jakarta to Pangkal Pinang.

12 December
 A missile strike by an American unmanned aerial vehicle on a convoy of ground vehicles in Radda, Yemen kills at least 13 people. The vehicles had been bound for a wedding party. Conflicting reports state that the UAV struck the convoy by mistake and that the UAV targeted the convoy to kill Islamic militants riding in it, although reports also disagree as to whether any militants were present.

13 December
 Avionics technician Terry Lee Loewen is arrested after he enters the grounds of Wichita Mid-Continent Airport in Wichita, Kansas, intending to detonate a suicide bomb. On 1 September 2015, he will be sentenced to 20 years in prison

15 December
 South Koreas expanded air defense information zone over the East China Sea goes into effect, with Republic of Korea Air Force airborne early warning and control aircraft patrolling the zone on the first day. South Korea announces that such flights will continue, and that Republic of Korea Navy P-3C Orion antisubmarine patrol aircraft also will fly missions in the zone four to five times per week.
 Syrian government helicopters drop barrels filled with explosives and fuel on rebel-held areas in northern Aleppo, Syria, destroying cars and buildings and killing at least 37 people.

16 December
 Syrian helicopters continue to pound Aleppo in northern Syria, where the death toll exceeds 100 during the two days of barrel-bomb attacks on densely crowded neighborhoods. Syrian aircraft also strike the villages of Inkhil and Jassem in southern Syria, killing two women and two children.

17 December
 Six American troops die when a Black Hawk helicopter is shot down in Zabul Province, Afghanistan.

20 December
 Vanilla Air begins flight operations, flying from Tokyo's Narita International Airport to Okinawa and Taipei.
 Hours after the French wine entrepreneur James Gregoire sells his luxury Bordeaux chateau, Chateau de La Riviere, to billionaire Chinese hotel magnate Lam Kok, owner of the Brilliant hotel chain, the two men and Koks 12-year-old son and an interpreter die when the helicopter Gregoire is piloting on an aerial tour of the property crashes into the river Dordogne near Lugon-et-l'Île-du-Carnay, France. Eyewitnesses report two people struggling in the water after the crash, but they apparently drown in the rushing water. A previous owner of the property had died in a 2002 aircraft crash.

21 December
 Syrian helicopters drop barrel bombs on opposition-held portions of Aleppo, killing at least six people.
 Rebel ground fire damages three United States Air Force CV-22 Osprey aircraft as they approach Bor, South Sudan, to evacuate American citizens threatened by combat between rebel and government forces, wounding four American military personnel. The Ospreys abort their mission and fly the wounded to Entebbe, Uganda, from which a U.S. Air Force C-17 Globemaster III transports the injured personnel to Nairobi, Kenya, for hospitalization.

22 December
 For an eighth straight day, Syrian helicopters attack rebel-held areas in and near Aleppo with barrel bombs, killing at least 32 people. Syrian aircraft also strike the Bab al-Hawa Border Crossing on the northern border with Turkey, killing or wounding several people. Estimates of the combined death toll in the days attacks on Aleppo and the border crossing later rise to at least 45.

23 December
 In a ninth day of barrel-bomb attacks on Aleppo and its suburbs, and in strikes on three other towns in the Aleppo Governorate including Azaz on the Turkish border, Syrian helicopters kill at least 45 more people. Since beginning on 15 December, the daily airstrikes have killed an estimated 364 people.

24 December
 Syrian helicopters attack rebel-controlled portions of Aleppo for the tenth straight day, killing at least 15 people. One estimate places the death toll at at least 33, with another 150 injured.
 After sniper fire from the Gaza Strip mortally wounds an Israeli civilian maintenance worker as he performs repairs on the Israeli side of the border fence, Israeli Air Force aircraft join Israeli tanks and infantry in a retaliatory cross-border attack, killing two Palestinians.

25 December
 Activists place the number of people killed by Syrian helicopters dropping barrel bombs on rebel-held areas of Aleppo at 401 over the eleven days of attacks which began on 15 December.

26 December
 A Russian Antonov An-12 cargo aircraft crashes into warehouses at a military facility in Siberia, killing all nine people on board.
 Textron, the parent company of Cessna Aircraft, announces that it has reached an agreement to purchase Beechcraft Corporation for $1,400,000,000.

28 December
 A Syrian airstrike on a vegetable market in the Tariq al-Bab neighborhood of Aleppo kills at least 21, and perhaps as many as 25, people.

30 December
 Lebanese antiaircraft guns fire at Syrian Air Force helicopters which the gunners claim have violated Lebanese airspace. It is the first time that the Lebanese armed forces have fired at Syrian forces since the beginning of the Syrian Civil War in March 2011.
 Followers of evangelical preacher Joseph Mukungubila, known as "The Prophet," attack N'djili Airport and other targets in Kinshasa in the Democratic Republic of the Congo. Sixteen people who die in an exchange of gunfire at the airport are among 40 people killed in the attacks. Flights approaching the airport for a landing are forced to divert elsewhere.
 The U.S. Federal Aviation Administration announces that after considering proposals from 25 teams in 24 states, it has selected six teams to test various aspects of the integration of unmanned aerial vehicles into the airspace of the United States: the University of Alaska in Alaska, which will examine standards for unmanned aircraft categories, state monitoring, and navigation, including testing in Hawaii and Oregon; the State of Nevada, which will study UAV standards and operations, UAV operator standards and certification requirements, and air traffic control procedures; Griffiss International Airport in Rome, New York, which will develop test, evaluation, verification, and validation processes and study UAV sense-and-avoid technologies; the Commerce Department of the State of North Dakota, which will develop UAV airworthiness essential data, validate high reliability link technology, and research human factors; Texas A&M University–Corpus Christi in Corpus Christi, Texas, which will develop safety requirements for UAVs and UAV operations; and Virginia Tech in Blacksburg, Virginia, which will examine UAV failures and their associated technical and operational risks and consequences, using test ranges in Virginia and New Jersey. Test sites are to remain active through at least 13 February 2017.
 For the first time in more than 50 years, a commercial flight takes place between Key West, Florida, and Cuba, when a Cessna 441 Conquest II with nine paying passengers aboard flies from Key West International Airport to Havana. Key West had received approval to conduct flights to and from Cuba in October 2011, but it had taken over two years for charter airline operators to receive all the necessary permissions to make the first flight. Key West International Airport director Peter Horton describes the flight as "test run," and regular Key West-Cuba commercial air service remains a distant prospect.

31 December
 Thousands of people chanting slogans denouncing the Central African Republics president, Michel Djotodia, push past French security forces and occupy the runway at Bangui M'Poko International Airport in Bangui. International flights to the airport are suspended.
 Tracey Curtis-Taylor arrives at Goodwood, West Sussex, England, at the end of a 9,825-mile (15,821-kilometer), 59-day flight from Cape Town International Airport in Cape Town, South Africa, in the Boeing-Stearman Model 75 Spirit of Artemis. During the flight – which recreates the first South Africa-to-London flight in a small, open-cockpit plane in history, made over the course of three months in 1928 by Mary, Lady Heath, in an Avro Avian – Curtis-Taylor has made 38 stops, flying over Zimbabwe, Zambia, Tanzania, Kenya, Uganda, Sudan, and Egypt before crossing Europe and arriving in England only 13 days behind schedule despite various challenges and setbacks along the way.
 Evergreen International Aviation files for its own dissolution under U.S. Chapter 7 bankruptcy law. The filing is on behalf of itself and its subsidiaries Evergreen Aviation Ground Logistics Enterprise, Evergreen Defense and Security Services, Evergreen International Airlines, Evergreen Systems Logistics, Evergreen Trade, and Supertanker Services.

First flights

June
14 June – Airbus A350 XWB (registration F-WXWB) at Toulouse–Blagnac Airport, Toulouse, France

September
16 September – Bombardier CS100 (C-FBCS) at Montréal-Mirabel International Airport, Montreal, Quebec.
17 September – Boeing 787-9 (N789ZB) at Paine Field in Everett, Washington, United States.
26 September – Gee Bee Super Q.E.D. II

October
24 October – e-Go (G-OFUN) at Tibenham airfield, Norfolk, England.

November
14 November – Piaggio-Selex P.1HH HammerHead (XAV-SA-001) at Trapani Airport, Italy.

December
28 December – Embraer Legacy 450 PT-ZIJ at Sao Jose dos Campos, Brazil.

Entered service

1 August – Airbus A400M Atlas with the French Air Force

Retirements

September
20 September – Vickers VC10 by the Royal Air Force

References

 
Aviation by year